RVL may stand for:

Organizations
 Racing Victoria Limited, the organisation which administers horse racing in Victoria, Australia
 Regio-Verkehrsverbund Lörrach, a German transport association in Baden-Württemberg
 RusVelo Russian cycling team, now Gazprom–RusVelo

Transport
 Mifflin County Airport, FAA LID code RVL
 Raritan Valley Line, an American commuter rail service operated by New Jersey Transit
 Roseville railway station, Sydney, Australia
 RVL Aviation, a British airline, part of RVL Group

Other uses
 RVL, prefix for the numbering scheme of the Wii video game console, and its parts and accessories
 "RVL 6768" (September 27, 2016), the pilot episode of the post-apocalyptic SyFy TV series, Aftermath, starring Anne Heche